Zborov may refer to:

 Zboriv (Зборів, Zborów, Zborov), a city in Ternopil Oblast (Galicia), Ukraine
 Battle of Zboriv (1649), fought in the vicinity of Zborów (village of Mlynivtsi, Ukraine) at the Strypa River
 Treaty of Zboriv (1649), signed on August 17, 1649
 Battle of Zborov (1917), a small part of the Kerensky Offensive (the last Russian offensive in World War I, taking place in July 1917)
 Zborov (Šumperk District), a village in Olomouc Region, Czech Republic
 Zborov, Bardejov, a village in Slovakia
 Zborov Castle, situated near the village of Zborov in East Slovakia
 Zborov nad Bystricou, a village in Slovakia

See also
 Zborów (disambiguation)